Virender is a given name. Notable people with the name include:

Virender Lal Chopra (1936–2020), Indian biotechnologist, geneticist, agriculturalist, director-general of ICAR
Virender Dahiya, Haryana cricketer
Virender Dev Dixit, former Brahma Kumari adherent who established the Adhyatmik Ishwariya Vishwa Vidyalaya
Virender Singh Kadian, Indian lawyer and politician
Virender Kanwar, Indian politician
Virender Kashyap, Indian politician
Virender Sangwan (born 1964), Indian ophthalmologist, professor
Virender Sehwag (born 1978), former Indian cricketer
Virender Sharma (born 1971), Indian former cricketer
Choudhary Virender Singh, Indian politician
Virender Singh (judge) (born 1954), Indian Judge and former Chief Justice of High Court of Jharkhand High Court
Virender Singh (Thakran) (born 1970), former Indian wrestler
Virender Singh (Deaf Wrestler) (born 1986), Indian freestyle wrestler

See also
Varendra
Veerendra
Virendra